Simon Ernest Sobeloff (December 3, 1894 – July 11, 1973) was an American attorney and jurist, who served as Solicitor General of the United States, as Chief Judge of the Court of Appeals of Maryland, and as a United States circuit judge of the United States Court of Appeals for the Fourth Circuit.

Education and career

Sobeloff was born in Baltimore, Maryland, the son of Jacob and Mary Hilda (Kaplan) Sobeloff, who were Russian Jewish immigrants. Sobeloff attended public schools including Baltimore City College and the University of Maryland School of Law, where he received his Bachelor of Laws in 1915. He served as a Page in the United States House of Representatives in 1910. He was admitted to the Maryland Bar in 1914, was a law clerk in Baltimore the same year, and subsequently went into private practice. From 1919 through 1924 he served as the assistant city solicitor for Baltimore and was appointed the deputy city solicitor for Baltimore from 1927 to 1931. In 1931 he became the United States Attorney for the District of Maryland, where he served until 1934. Subsequently, he was selected to be the Baltimore City Solicitor and the special counsel to Baltimore City Housing Commission. He served as Chairman of the Commission on the Administrative Organization of the State of Maryland from 1951 to 1952. In 1952, he was appointed to the position of Chief Judge of the Maryland Court of Appeals, where he served until 1954.

Solicitor General

From 1954 through 1956, Sobeloff served as United States Solicitor General in the Administration of President Dwight D. Eisenhower. Sobeloff presented the government's arguments on the implementation of the Supreme Court's decision in Brown v. Board of Education, to outlaw segregation in public schools.

Federal judicial service

Sobeloff was nominated by President Dwight D. Eisenhower on January 12, 1956, to a seat on the United States Court of Appeals for the Fourth Circuit vacated by Judge Morris Ames Soper. He was confirmed by the United States Senate on July 16, 1956, and received his commission on July 18, 1956. He served as Chief Judge and as a member of the Judicial Conference of the United States from 1958 to 1964. He assumed senior status on December 31, 1970. Sobeloff served in that capacity until his death on July 11, 1973, in Baltimore, MD. Sobeloff is buried in Hebrew Friendship Cemetery in Baltimore.

Family

Sobeloff married Irene Ehrlich in May 1918 and they had two daughters and four grandchildren.

See also
 List of Jewish American jurists

References

Sources
Solicitor General's Website

External links
 Judge Simon E. Sobeloff, 1894–1973
 
 Simon Sobeloff at the Justice Department bio page

1894 births
1973 deaths
American people of Russian-Jewish descent
Burials at Hebrew Friendship Cemetery
Jewish American people in Maryland politics
Lawyers from Baltimore
Baltimore City College alumni
University of Maryland Francis King Carey School of Law alumni
United States Attorneys for the District of Maryland
United States Solicitors General
Chief Judges of the Maryland Court of Appeals
Judges of the United States Court of Appeals for the Fourth Circuit
United States court of appeals judges appointed by Dwight D. Eisenhower
20th-century American judges